Princess Ragnhild, Mrs Lorentzen (Ragnhild Alexandra; 9 June 1930 – 16 September 2012), was the eldest child of King Olav V of Norway and Princess Märtha of Sweden. She was the older sister of King Harald V and Princess Astrid. She was the first royal to have been born in Norway since the Middle Ages. In 1953 she married the industrialist Erling Lorentzen, a member of the Lorentzen family of shipping magnates. In the same year they moved to Brazil, where her husband was an industrialist and a main owner of Aracruz Celulose. She lived in Brazil until her death 59 years later.

Although she was the King's eldest child, she was never in the line of succession to the Norwegian throne, owing to Norway's law of agnatic succession. She was in the line of succession to the British throne, and occupied the 16th and 17th place in that succession line during her childhood and youth.

Early life
Princess Ragnhild was the first Norwegian princess to have been born on Norwegian soil for 629 years. She grew up at the royal residence of Skaugum near Asker, west of Oslo. She was christened in the Palace Chapel on 27 June 1930 and her godparents were: her paternal grandparents, The King and Queen of Norway; her maternal grandparents, The Duke and Duchess of Västergötland; her great uncle, The King of Sweden; her great aunt, Princess Victoria of the United Kingdom; her maternal aunt, Princess Axel of Denmark; and The Duke of York.

In 1940, during World War II, she and her family fled the German invasion of Norway, and she spent the wartime years in exile with her mother and siblings in Bethesda, Maryland, located northwest of Washington, D.C. Before the birth of her younger brother, it was assumed she would accede to the throne in the absence of a male heir, although this would have required a constitutional amendment, as women could not inherit the throne at the time.

Marriage and family
Princess Ragnhild married Erling Lorentzen, a member of the Norwegian merchant upper-class (see Lorentzen family), in Asker on 15 May 1953. Lorentzen was a businessman and army officer who had served as her bodyguard during the War. There was great controversy at the time as she was the first member of the Norwegian Royal Family to marry non-royalty. (In Norway, there is a tradition of "official flagdays", and royal birthdays are normally listed as such occasions; however, soon after the couple's wedding, it was announced that her birthday (9 June) would cease to be such an official flagday.)

Following her marriage, the couple moved to Rio de Janeiro, where her husband had substantial business holdings. Their residence in Brazil there was originally temporary, but they eventually settled there, and remained in Rio until Ragnhild's death in 2012. The couple had three children.
In Brazil, her husband founded Aracruz Celulose. 
Haakon Lorentzen (b. 23 August 1954), married Martha Carvalho de Freitas on April 14, 1982, and had 3 children, each born in Rio de Janeiro:
Olav Alexander (b. 11 July 1985)
Christian Frederik (b. 23 May 1988)
Sophia (b. 28 Jun 1994)
Ingeborg Lorentzen (b. 27 February 1957), married Paulo César Ribeiro Filho, son of Paulo César Ribeiro and Ercilia Cabral Pereira, and had one daughter. 
Victoria Ragna Lorentzen Ribeiro (b. 19 December 1988), married Felipe Sampaio Octaviano Falcão and has two children:
Frederik Sven Lorentzen Falcão (b. 28 September 2016)
Alice Eva Lorentzen Falcão (b. 21 October 2022)
Ragnhild Alexandra Lorentzen (b. 8 May 1968), married Aaron Matthew Long. They had two daughters.
Alexandra Joyce Lorentzen Long (b. 14 December 2007)
Elizabeth Patricia Lorentzen Long (b. March 2011)

Public life
Princess Ragnhild opened the 1952 Winter Olympics in Oslo, Norway, as her father and grandfather were attending the funeral of King George VI.

A conservative, Princess Ragnhild publicly criticized her niece and nephew, Princess Märtha Louise and Crown Prince Haakon Magnus, for their choice of spouses, in 2004.

Princess Ragnhild was patron of the Norwegian Organisation for the Hearing Impaired.

Several ships, including MS Prinsesse Ragnhild, were named for her.

Death
Princess Ragnhild died of cancer at her home in Rio de Janeiro on 16 September 2012, aged 82. Her body arrived in Oslo on 24 September 2012, where her brother King  Harald V and her sister Princess Astrid were present to greet her alongside her spouse Erling and their children. The funeral of Princess Ragnhild was held on 28 September 2012 in the chapel of the Royal Palace of Oslo. She was later cremated and privately interred in the church of Asker.

Titles, styles and honours

Titles

 9 June 193015 May 1953: Her Royal Highness Princess Ragnhild of Norway
 15 May 195316 September 2012: Her Highness Princess Ragnhild, Mrs. Lorentzen

Honours

National honours
 : Knight Grand Cross  of the Order of St. Olav
 : Dame of the Royal Family Decoration King Haakon VII
 : Dame of the Royal Family Decoration of King Olav V
 : Dame of the Royal Family Decoration of King Harald V
 : Recipient of the King Haakon VII Golden Jubilee Medal
 : Recipient of the Medal of the 100th Anniversary of the Birth of King Haakon VII
 : Recipient of the King Olav V Silver Jubilee Medal
 : Recipient of the King Olav V Commemorative Medal
 : Recipient of the Medal of the 100th Anniversary of the Birth of King Olav V
 : Recipient of the Royal House Centenary Medal

Foreign honours
 : Grand Cross of the Order of the Southern Cross
 : Knight Grand Cross of the Order of Orange-Nassau
 : Honorary Knight Grand Cross of the Order of the Crown
 : Grand Cross of the Order of Merit
 : Member Grand Cross of the Royal Order of the Polar Star
 : Recipient of 90th Birthday Badge Medal of King Gustav V

Honorific eponym
A 540 000 km2 area in Antarctica is named Princess Ragnhild Coast in her honour. The Jahre Line (later Color Line) cruiseferry  was named in her honour.

Ancestry
She was a great-great granddaughter of Queen Victoria of the United Kingdom and great granddaughter of Edward VII of Great Britain, thus a second cousin to Queen Elizabeth II. At the time of her birth she was 17th in the line of succession to the British throne, and 77th at the time of her death. Princess Ragnhild's maternal aunt was Queen Astrid of Belgium, which also made Princess Ragnhild a first cousin of kings Baudouin and Albert II of Belgium and of Joséphine-Charlotte of Belgium, Grand Duchess of Luxembourg. Through her maternal grandmother, Princess Ingeborg of Denmark, she was also a second cousin of Queen Margrethe II of Denmark and Queen Anne Marie of Greece as well as a second cousin once removed of King Carl XVI Gustaf of Sweden through her maternal grandfather Prince Carl of Sweden.

References

External links
 Official biography at kongehuset.no
 Aftenposten article about her life (Norwegian)

1930 births
2012 deaths
Norwegian princesses
House of Glücksburg (Norway)
Lorentzen family
Norwegian expatriates in Brazil
Recipients of the Order of Orange-Nassau
Knights Grand Cross of the Order of Orange-Nassau
Recipients of the Order of the Crown (Netherlands)
Grand Crosses of the Order of the Crown (Netherlands)
Grand Crosses of the Order of Merit (Portugal)
Commanders Grand Cross of the Order of the Polar Star
Daughters of kings